The Ambassador Extraordinary and Plenipotentiary of the Russian Federation to the Republic of the Sudan is the official representative of the President and the Government of the Russian Federation to the President and the Government of Sudan.

The ambassador and his staff work at large in the Embassy of Russia in Khartoum.

History of diplomatic relations

Diplomatic relations at the mission level between the Soviet Union and Sudan were first established in January 1956. The first ambassador, was appointed on 24 March 1956, and presented his credentials on 30 April 1956. With the dissolution of the Soviet Union in 1991, the Soviet ambassador, continued as representative of the Russian Federation until 1992.

List of representatives (1956 – present)

Representatives of the Soviet Union to Sudan (1956 – 1991)

Representatives of the Russian Federation to Sudan (1991 – present)

See also
Foreign relations of Russia
Ambassadors of Russia

References 

Sudan
Russia
Ambassadors of Russia to Sudan